Tod Sirod Reef, formerly known as Collier 1 Reef is an artificial reef in the Gulf of Mexico, off the coast of Collier County, Florida. It is part of a network of artificial reefs off the coast of the county.

History
Construction of the reef was done by a public-private partnership in 2015.
In total 36 artificial reefs off the Collier County coastline has been created in  six new reef areas.

Structure
The reef is composed of pyramid-shaped limestone reef modules and old concrete benches.

Marine life
Since their installation, the reef structure has been colonized by many forms of marine life including giant anemones and symbiotic cleaner shrimp, wing-oysters, tunicates, soft coral, algae, variegated and rock-boring urchins, and sea cucumbers. Fish observed at the reef include mangrove and lane snappers, sheepshead, spadefish, jack-knifefish, butterfly fish, grouper, angelfish, wrasse, and grunts.

References

Artificial reefs
Reefs of Florida
Environment of Florida
2015 establishments in Florida